Vice Admiral (abbreviated as VADM) is a three-star commissioned armed flag officer rank in the Pakistan Navy, coast guards, and marines awarded by the Government of Pakistan to rear admirals as a position advancement in uniformed service. It is the second-highest rank in Pakistan armed services with a NATO code of OF-8, and while it is worn on epaulettes with a three-star insignia, it ranks above two-star rank Rear Admiral and below four-star rank Admiral. Vice admiral is equivalent to the rank of Lieutenant general of Pakistan Army and Air marshal of the Pakistan Air Force.

Vice Admiral in the Pakistan Navy is a very senior flag officer rank and is abbreviated as V/ADMPN to distinguish it from the same ranks offered in other countries, although there is no official abbreviation available for a Pakistani vice admiral. Vice admiral may be also called as three-star admiral to distinguish it from other insignias such as two-star Rear admiral and four-star admiral.

Appointment and promotion
Awarded by the Government of Pakistan to rear admirals as a position advancement in uniformed service.

Statutory limits
Since it's the second-highest rank coupled with additional powers and benefits, the law of Pakistan restricts the use of unsanctioned power by a three-star admiral and can be constraint under a certain constitutional amendment.

Gallery

References

Pakistan Navy ranks
Pakistan Navy